Red Rock Dam is a dam in central Iowa, United States, on the Des Moines River, forming Lake Red Rock. It is contained entirely within Marion County. The nearest cities are Pella to the northeast, and Knoxville to the southwest.

The dam consists of a rolled earthfill embankment and a gravity concrete control section. A compacted impervious cutoff trench to bedrock and a grout curtain in the rock are provided for underseepage control.

It was constructed along with Saylorville Dam as a flood control project by the US Army Corps of Engineers, Rock Island District. Major flooding occurred in 1851, 1859, 1903, 1944, 1947, and 1954. In 1960, the Corps began construction. The project was completed in 1969 at a cost of $88 million. The Army Corps maintains its local offices in Knoxville.

In 2014, work started to retrofit the dam to provide hydro-electric power. At a capacity of 36.4 MW it is estimated that annual energy produced by the project will be 178,000 MWh, or enough to power approximately 18,000 homes. The primary purpose of the dam will remain to manage flood control.

Extensive recreational development along the lakeshore rapidly followed.

It was a key location in the 1972 movie A Thief in the Night and its 1978 sequel A Distant Thunder.
Lake Red Rock was named after one of the lost towns under the reservoir, Red Rock.

The dam was supposed to take 3 years to fill but it was filled in 5 days to max capacity due to the prevented flood of 1969.

See also
 Lake Red Rock (Des Moines River)
 Des Moines River
 Saylorville Dam
 Elk Rock State Park

References

External links
 U.S. Army Corps of Engineers - Lake Red Rock
 Red Rock Lake - Recreation.gov, recreation and parks information, camping reservations
 Water Levels and Releases (U.S. Army Corps of Engineers)
 Red Rock Lake Hydropower Project Website
 Iowa Department of Natural Resources (DNR)

Buildings and structures in Marion County, Iowa
Dams in Iowa
United States Army Corps of Engineers dams
Dams completed in 1969